is a Chinese singer, actor and professional table tennis player.

Career 
Wang Bowen is as a pop singer, film and television actor, and national-level table tennis player.

In 2010, Wang joined the Hunan TV "Happy Boys"., debuted in 2014, starred in the movie "my 23-year-old".

In September 2016, Wang Bowen launched a new EP, a big movie earlier in the network.

Education
Bachelor of Journalism Department of Jilin University.

Discography

Filmography

Film

Short film

Web dramas

References

External links
Weibo
Facebook
Music Baidu
ITunes

Chinese Mandopop singers
Living people
1994 births
21st-century Chinese male singers
Chinese male table tennis players